Shouchangoceratinae is one of three ammonoid subfamilies of the family Pseudohaloritidae, which in turn is one of two families in the Goniatitid superfamily Pseudohaloritoidea.  The Shouchangoceratinid ammonoids were found in marine environments throughout the world during the Permian, particularly in China.

References
 The Paleobiology Database accessed on 10/01/07

  
Pseudohaloritidae
Permian extinctions